Patricia Hy-Boulais (born 22 August 1965) is a former tennis player. She turned professional on 12 October 1986. Early in her career she represented Hong Kong (since the beginning until the end of the 1987 season). She became a citizen of Canada in 1991. However, she represented Canada since the beginning of the 1988 season. Her best performance at a Grand Slam came when she got to the quarter finals of the 1992 US Open, defeating Eva Švíglerová, Judith Wiesner, Jennifer Capriati and Helena Suková before losing to eventual champion Monica Seles.

After Hy-Boulais did it in 1992, Canada did not have another woman to survive into the second week at the French Open until Aleksandra Wozniak did it in 2009.

Hy-Boulais represented her new country at the 1996 Summer Olympics in Atlanta, Georgia, where she was eliminated in the second round by the number one seed Monica Seles. Hy-Boulais reached her highest ranking in the WTA Tour on 8 March 1993, when she became the number 28 of the world.

Hy-Boulais's daughter Isabelle is a top Canadian tennis prospect.

Personal life
Patricia Hy-Boulais had an athletic family. Her father was a tennis player for Cambodia and served as the team captain. He also has competed in the Davis Cup for Cambodia. Her mother was a national badminton champion for Cambodia.

WTA finals

Singles (1 title, 1 runner-up)

Doubles (1 title, 2 runner-ups)

ITF Finals

Singles (4-2)

Doubles (5-1)

References

External links
 
 
 
 
 New article about her induction into Canada's tennis Hall of Fame

1965 births
Living people
Canadian female tennis players
Grand Slam (tennis) champions in girls' doubles
Hong Kong emigrants to Canada
Hong Kong female tennis players
Naturalized citizens of Canada
Olympic tennis players of Canada
Olympic tennis players of Hong Kong
Sportspeople from Phnom Penh
Tennis players from Toronto
Tennis players at the 1984 Summer Olympics
Tennis players at the 1992 Summer Olympics
Tennis players at the 1996 Summer Olympics
Wimbledon junior champions